William Openshaw Freeburn (7 April 1930 – 25 December 2019) was a Scottish footballer, who played as a full-back.

References

1930 births
2019 deaths
Footballers from Hamilton, South Lanarkshire
Scottish footballers
Association football fullbacks
Dunfermline Athletic F.C. players
East Stirlingshire F.C. players
Grimsby Town F.C. players
English Football League players